Yunost Stadium may refer to:

 Yunost Stadium (Armavir), Russia
 Yunost Stadium (Lida), Belarus
 Yunost Stadium (Mozyr), Belarus
 Yunost Stadium (Oral), Kazakhstan
 Yunost Stadium (Slonim), Belarus
 Yunost Stadium (Smorgon), Belarus
 Yunost Stadium (Osipovichi), Belarus
 Yunost Stadium (Chernihiv), Ukraine